Jenny Pearson is a British teacher and children's author.

In 2020, she published, The Super Miraculous Journey of Freddie Yates, which The Guardian called a "caper of a debut", and The Times "very funny".

The book has sold to eighteen countries.

The Times called The Incredible Record Smashers, her 2021 second book, "a genuinely funny novel with a mental health theme".

Publications
The Super Miraculous Journey of Freddie Yates, 2020 (illustrated by Rob Biddulph)
The Incredible Record Smashers, 2021 (illustrated by Erica Salcedo)

References

Living people
21st-century British novelists
British children's writers
Year of birth missing (living people)